Grandes Éxitos de Juan Luis Guerra y 440 or simply Grandes Éxitos is a compilation album of Dominican singer-songwriter Juan Luis Guerra, and his band 440 released in July 1995 by Karem Records. It contained Guerra's fifteen biggest hits from 1988 to 1994 on the original version and from the albums Mudanza y Acarreo (1985) to Fogarate! (1994) on the international versions. The compilation receive positive reviews by the critics.

Among the tracks are two songs from the controversial album Áreito that was said to have anti-capitalist tendencies. Although Guerra decieded to quit recording protest songs, he included these two tracks, of which El costo de la vida was his first number-one hit in the Hot Latin Tracks. On September 17, 1996, the album was re-released to include the two tracks "Si tu te vas" (Guerra first merengue song) and "Señorita", a track that he composed for the movie "My Family".

The album was commercial success and reached the Top 10 in Argentina, Chile, Spain and US Billboard Latin Charts. It also, peaked at the Top 20 of Netherlands and Portugal and was certified platinum on Spain and Argentina. In the United States, it was the 7th best selling tropical albums of 1996. According to some sources, it sold 7 million of copies worldwide.

Background and Composition 
Grandes Exitos de Juan Luis Guerra y 440 compiles a marvelous array of highlights from the Dominican icon's late-'80s and early-'90s rise to fame. Guerra's career began to peak with his fourth album, Ojalá Que Llueva Café (1989). Three songs from that album ("Visa Para un Sueño," "Ojalá Que Llueva Café," "Woman del Callao") are compiled on the record.  Seven of the ten songs from fifth album Bachata Rosa (1990) are compiled here ("Rosalía," "Como Abeja al Panal," "Carta de Amor," "A Pedir Su Mano," "La Bilirrubina," "Burbujas de Amor," "Bachata Rosa").

From his sixth studio album Areito, it includes the particular the hit singles "Frio Frio" and "El Costo de la Vida". "Guavaberry" from his LP Mientras mas lo pienso... Tu (1987) is included. From his seventh studio album "Fogarate!", the only song included is "La Cosquillita".

Track listing

Personnel 
The following credits are from AllMusic and from the Grandes Exitos de Juan Luis Guerra 4.40 liner notes:

 Julio Cesar Delgado - Composer
 Diblo Dibala - Composer
 Juan Luis Guerra - Composer, Primary Artist
 Julio Hiraldo - Graphic Design
 Lea Lignanzy - Composer
 Elena Ramírez - Graphic Design
 Francisco Ulloa - Composer

Charts

Certifications

References

External links

1995 greatest hits albums
Juan Luis Guerra compilation albums
Spanish-language compilation albums